Brown Girl in the Ring is a 1998 novel written by Jamaican-Canadian writer Nalo Hopkinson. The novel contains Afro-Caribbean culture with themes of folklore and magical realism. It was the winning entry in the Warner Aspect First Novel Contest. Since the selection, Hopkinson's novel has received critical acclaim in the form of the 1999 Locus Award for Best First Novel, and the 1999 John W. Campbell Award for Best New Writer.

In 2008, the actress and singer Jemeni defended this novel in Canada Reads, an annual literary competition broadcast on the Canadian Broadcasting Corporation.

Plot
The setting of Brown Girl in The Ring is post-apocalyptic in nature. The story takes place in the city core of Metropolitan Toronto (Downtown Toronto) after the economic collapse. Riots of the past have caused the inner city of Toronto to collapse into a slum of poverty, homelessness, and violence. While the elite and city officials have fled to the suburbs, children are left to fend for themselves and survive on the streets. As a consequence of the Riots, Toronto is isolated from other satellite cities in the surrounding Greater Toronto Area (North York, Scarborough, Etobicoke) by roadblocks and Lake Ontario has become a mudhole. Disappearances and murder are not uncommon, and everyone is left to either fend for themselves or bind together to provide support for each other.

In the twelve years since the Riots, the city is now ruled by a criminal mastermind, Rudy Sheldon, and his posse of criminal thugs. Rudy is commissioned to find a heart for the Premier of Ontario, who needs a heart transplant. Normally, the Porcine Organ Harvest Program is used, but the adviser of Premier Catherine Uttley encourages her to deem the program "immoral" and make a public statement of preference for a human donor instead.

Hopkinson then introduces the heroine of the story, and a very different perspective of life in the outskirt of the city is seen. Ti-Jeanne, the granddaughter of Gros-Jeanne, is struggling with different problems than street survival. Having recently given birth to a baby boy, Ti-Jeanne is forced to move back in with her grandmother to care for her child as a single mother; the child's father, Tony, suffers from addiction and is a member of the posse. While she loves her Mami, she has difficulty seeing the importance of her grandmother's spiritualism and medicinal work, and is frightened by her visions of death. Gros-Jeanne has gone to great lengths in the past to share her culture with her family, but has continuously been pushed away by her daughter and granddaughter. In the community, she is a well-respected apothecary and spiritualist who runs an herbal and medicine shop.

Paths begin to cross when Tony is called upon by Rudy. Hopes of leaving his criminal life behind and reconnecting with his love, Ti-Jeanne, are shattered when the threats from the posse leader begin to loom over him. Tony must perform a horrific murder in order to obtain a heart that will save the life of one of the city's elite. The situation only gets worse when he involves his relationship with Ti-Jeanne and Gros-Jeanne with his business with the posse. He arrives on Gros-Jeanne's doorstep asking for protection, and Ti-Jeanne convinces her to help him flee the city without harm.

The magic comes alive for the rest of the novel when Tony seeks help from the spiritualism of Gros-Jeanne. In attempts to save Tony, Ti-Jeanne performs the rituals alongside her Mami and accepts her father spirit. When plans go awry, Tony makes a rash decision that forces Ti-Jeanne to be the one to save herself and the city from Rudy's evil spiritual acts.

Later in the novel, Rudy is revealed to be Ti-Jeanne's grandfather, Gros-Jeanne's husband. It turns out that Rudy was an abusive husband and Gros-Jeanne kicked him out and found a new lover, named Dunston, and since Rudy has been vengeful.

Meanwhile, Rudy summons the Calabash Duppy spirit and commands the duppy to kill Gros-Jeanne, Ti-Jeanne and Tony, who was sent to kill Gros-Jeanne and take her heart for Premier Uttley. It's revealed that the duppy is Mi-Jeanne (Ti-Jeanne's mom).

In the CN Tower, Rudy sets the Calabash spirit on Ti-Jeanne who has come to confront him after Tony killed Gros-Jeanne. Ti-Jeanne is trapped and injected with Buff, a drug that paralyzes her. While in a state of paralysis, Ti-Jeanne slips into an "astral" state or spirit state, and calls upon the ancestor spirits to help her. They kill Rudy by allowing the weights of every murder he has done fall on him.

Meanwhile, Premier Uttley's new heart (Gros-Jeanne's heart) attacks her body. Eventually, it takes over her spirit and when she wakes up from the surgery, she has a change of mind about human heart donorship and declares that she will make an attempt to help Toronto return to a rule of law by funding small business owners.

On Gros-Jeanne's Nine Night event, all her friends arrive to help out, and so does Tony. Ti-Jeanne has trouble forgiving him for killing Gros-Jeanne, but Jenny tells her "he wants to do penance." She lets him into the event to say goodbye to Gros-Jeanne and is surprised that Baby doesn't cry around him anymore. It ends with Ti-Jeanne sitting on her steps, thinking of what she'll name Baby, who is possessed with the spirit of Dunston, Gros-Jeanne's former lover.

Ti-Jeanne's personal growth throughout the novel is evident in her attitude toward her elders, culture, and outlook on life. Through acceptance of her ancestry and culture, she finds power and support to overcome steep odds and end the horrific violence of the posse and their heinous leader, despite her personal connection to the man who took her mother away from her at a young age. The story closes with hope, Ti-Jeanne's victory is monumental, and the stolen heart possesses the power to permanently change the city of Toronto for the better.

Themes
Themes of feminism in women of color and the use of magic, "Obeah," or seer women are prevalent throughout this novel. Nalo Hopkinson presents strong female characters who take control of their fate to make change in the world. Her novel is a work of feminist science fiction and shows a realistic perception of the struggles women face as single mothers as well as the struggles women with different cultural beliefs face in society. However, it shows their ability to use their culture, background, and experiences as women to overcome obstacles and show the true strength women possess. In addition, the themes of community and money are seen with the street children.

Reception
F&SF reviewer Charles de Lint declared Brown Girl "one of the best debut novels to appear in years," although he acknowledged initial difficulty with the novel's "phonetic spellings and sometimes convoluted sentences."

Film adaptation 
After fifteen years of trying to adapt the novel to film, Canadian director Sharon Lewis decided to create a prequel instead.  The film, titled Brown Girl Begins, was filmed in 2015/2016, and premiered in 2017 before going into general theatrical release in 2018.

References

External links

Reviews
SF Site Featured Review by Neil Walsh (1998)
SF Site Featured Review by Donna McMahon (2002)

1998 Canadian novels
1998 fantasy novels
1998 science fiction novels
Canadian magic realism novels
Canadian horror novels
Novels by Nalo Hopkinson
Urban fantasy novels
Debut speculative fiction novels
Novels set in Toronto
Canadian novels adapted into films
Dystopian novels
Science fiction novels adapted into films
1998 debut novels